Jeff Haste is a former member of the Pennsylvania House of Representatives, representing the 104th legislative district. He was first elected on January 30, 1996. Haste also served on the Dauphin County Board of Commissioners from 2002 until 2021. He was named Chairman in 2004 and held that title until his retirement on May 26, 2021.

References

Republican Party members of the Pennsylvania House of Representatives
Living people
People from Dauphin County, Pennsylvania
Year of birth missing (living people)